Monash Special Developmental School is a Department of Education school in Victoria, Australia located in the Melbourne suburb of Wheelers Hill. It provides for students aged 2.8 to 18 years with significant developmental delay and/or intellectual disabilities including autism spectrum disorder and multiple disabilities.

External links 
Homepage

References

Schools in Melbourne
Special schools in Australia
Buildings and structures in the City of Monash